Adrian Olszewski (born 28 June 1993) is a Polish professional footballer who plays as a goalkeeper for the III liga side Olimpia Grudziądz.

Club career
Olszewski started his career, playing at youth levels for his hometown club Włókniarz Pabianice. He made his senior team debut as a teenager in 2009. In the 2010–11 season, he played youth football with ŁKS Łódź. He was promoted to the first team in 2011, and made his Ekstraklasa debut at the age of 18 on 6 May 2012 in a 1–2 away loss to Jagiellonia Białystok.

In March 2013, Olszewski signed a contract with IV liga club Bałtyk Koszalin. After helping the club gain promotion to the III liga, in July 2013, he moved to II liga side Pelikan Łowicz. In July 2014, Olszewski joined I liga club Bruk-Bet Termalica Nieciecza as a reserve goalkeeper. He later played for Polonia Bytom, Lechia Tomaszów Mazowiecki, Blomberger SV, and KSZO Ostrowiec Świętokrzyski.

On 21 July 2018, he signed a contract with Motor Lublin. In August 2020, he was announced as the Bytovia Bytów player. He made his debut in the Bytovia's 2–2 draw against Śląsk Wrocław's reserve team.

References

External links
 

1993 births
Polish footballers
Living people
Association football goalkeepers
ŁKS Łódź players
Pelikan Łowicz players
Bruk-Bet Termalica Nieciecza players
KSZO Ostrowiec Świętokrzyski players
Polonia Bytom players
Motor Lublin players
Bytovia Bytów players
Olimpia Grudziądz players
Ekstraklasa players
I liga players
II liga players
III liga players
IV liga players
Polish expatriate footballers
Expatriate footballers in Germany
Polish expatriate sportspeople in Germany